State Route 232 (SR 232) is a north–south secondary state highway located in northwestern Middle Tennessee. the  route traverses western Houston and southwestern Stewart counties. It connects SR 147 at McKinnon to U.S. Route 79 (US 79) and LBL Forest Road 236 in western Stewart County.

Route description

SR 232 begins in Houston County in McKinnon at an intersection with SR 147 just east of the Tennessee River. It goes north through wooded areas and crosses into Stewart County. It continues north through wooded and rural areas to pass through Mulberry Hill before coming to an end at an intersection with US 79/SR 76 in the Land Between the Lakes National Recreation Area.

Major intersections

References 

232
232
232